Vardia Insurance Group is a Norwegian insurance company, headquartered in Oslo, Norway. The company has operations in Norway, Sweden and Denmark. The company was listed on the Oslo Stock Exchange in 2014.

Companies
 Vardia Forsikring AS (Norway): Sortland (Headquarters), Hamar, Oslo, Molde, Porsgrunn
 Vardia Försäkring AB (Sweden): Stockholm (Headquarters), Luleå, Skellefteå, Sundsvall
 Vardia Forsikringsagentur A/S (Denmark): Copenhagen
 Vardia Agencies AS (Norway): Oslo 
 Saga Forsikring AS (Norway): Lysaker 
 Rein Forsikring AS (Norway): Oslo

References

Companies listed on the Oslo Stock Exchange
Insurance companies of Norway
Insurance companies of Denmark
Insurance companies of Sweden
Companies based in Oslo
Financial services companies established in 2009